White Horse Inn (Spanish: La hostería del caballito blanco) is a 1948 Argentine musical comedy film directed by Benito Perojo and written by Juan Carlos Muello based upon the homonymous opera White Horse Inn by Ralph Benatzky and Robert Stolz. It was premiered on April 15, 1948.

The plot is about a famous singer who falls in love with the owner of an inn.

Cast
 Alfredo Alaria	
 María Aurelia Bisutti		
 Héctor Calcaño		
 Susana Canales		
 Max Citelli		
 Tito Climent		
 María Ferez		
 Elisa Galvé		
 Hedy Krilla		
 Mecha López		
 Nelly Meden		
 Osvaldo Miranda		
 Hilda Muller		
 Raimundo Pastore		
 Héctor Quintanilla	
 Santiago Rebull		
 Tilda Thamar		
 Juan Carlos Thorry

External links

1948 films
1948 musical comedy films
1940s Spanish-language films
Argentine black-and-white films
Films directed by Benito Perojo
Operetta films
Films based on operettas
Argentine films based on plays
Films based on adaptations
Argentine musical comedy films
Films scored by Ralph Benatzky
1940s Argentine films